Matilda and the Ramsay Bunch is a British CBBC cooking entertainment program with the first series airing in April 2015 with first airing on 14 April 2015 and finished on 21 July 2015. The series was renew for a second series in early 2015 and began airing on 6 May 2016 and finished on 12 August 2016. On 19 July 2016 it was confirmed by CBBC that the series was renewed for a third series which began airing on 5 May 2017 and finished on 11 August 2017.

It was announced in July 2017 that the series had been that the show was renewed for a fourth series, which is due begin broadcast on 24 April 2018. The series follows the Ramsay Family as they go on their summer holidays around America and the United Kingdom as Tilly cooks up her favourite meals and while the rest of the Ramsay family go on adventures and take part in different challenges and games.

Series overview

Episodes

Series 1 (2015)

Series 2 (2016)

Series 3 (2017)

Series 4 (2018)

Series 5 (2019)

References

External links
 
 

Matilda and the Ramsay Bunch